Wilhelmsdorf is a municipality in the district Saale-Orla-Kreis, in Thuringia, Germany.

References

External links
 

Saale-Orla-Kreis